Charles E. Capehart (1833–1911) was an officer in the U.S. Cavalry during the American Civil War. He received the Medal of Honor for action following the Battle of Gettysburg on July 4, 1863.

Military service
Capehart enlisted in the Union Army and was commissioned captain and placed in command of Company A, 1st West Virginia Cavalry. He was promoted to major on June 6, 1863. Major Capehart assumed command of the regiment during the Battle of Gettysburg when Colonel Nathaniel P. Richmond had to assume command of the regiment's brigade after brigade commander Elon J. Farnsworth was killed leading a charge. On July 4, 1863, Capehart's regiment charged down a mountainside at night during a thunderstorm, attacking and capturing a retreating Confederate wagon train. This act would lead to the awarding of the Medal of Honor.

Capehart was promoted to lieutenant colonel on August 1, 1864. His brother, General Henry Capehart was also awarded the Medal of Honor for his actions in the Civil War. Capehart died on July 11, 1911, and was buried at Arlington National Cemetery, Arlington, Virginia.

Medal of Honor citation
For The President of the United States of America, in the name of Congress, takes pleasure in presenting the Medal of Honor to Major Charles E. Capehart, United States Army, for extraordinary heroism on 4 July 1863, while serving with 1st West Virginia Cavalry, in action at Monterey Mountain, Pennsylvania. While commanding the regiment, Major Capehart charged down the mountain side at midnight, in a heavy rain, upon the enemy's fleeing wagon train. Many wagons were captured and destroyed and many prisoners taken.

Date of Issue: April 7, 1898

Action Date: July 4, 1863

See also

 List of Medal of Honor recipients for the Battle of Gettysburg
 List of American Civil War Medal of Honor recipients: A–F

Notes

External links
 
 Charles E. Capehart at ArlingtonCemetery.net, an unofficial website
 

1833 births
1911 deaths
Union Army officers
United States Army Medal of Honor recipients
Burials at Arlington National Cemetery
American Civil War recipients of the Medal of Honor